On January 7, 2021, a United States Capitol Police (USCP) officer, Brian Sicknick, died after suffering two strokes the day after he responded to an . The District of Columbia chief medical examiner found that Sicknick had died from stroke, classifying his death as natural and additionally commented that "all that transpired played a role in his condition." His cremated remains were laid in honor in the Capitol Rotunda on February 2, 2021, before they were buried with full honors at Arlington National Cemetery.

Multiple media outlets reported Sicknick's death was due to injuries he sustained, but months later the Washington D.C. medical examiner reported there were no injuries to Sicknick. Within a day after his death, the U.S. Capitol Police and the U.S. Justice Department each said that his death was due to injuries from the riot. Meanwhile media, citing two anonymous law enforcement officials, incorrectly reported for weeks that Sicknick had died after being struck in the head with a fire extinguisher during the unrest.

Sicknick's death was investigated by the Metropolitan Police Department's Homicide Branch, the USCP, and the FBI. On March 14, Julian Khater and George Tanios were arrested for assaulting Sicknick with a chemical spray and for other charges. The medical examiner found no evidence that Sicknick had an allergic reaction to the chemical spray. Prosecutors later said on April 27 that the chemical spray was pepper spray. On January 28, 2023, Khater was sentenced to seven years in prison.

Victim background

Brian David Sicknick (July 30, 1978 – January 7, 2021) was born in New Brunswick, New Jersey, to Gladys and Charles Sicknick. He grew up in South River, New Jersey, as the youngest of three sons. Sicknick attended East Brunswick Technical High School to study electronics but later aspired to become a police officer. He graduated from the high school in 1997.After struggling to find a job as a police officer, Sicknick joined the New Jersey Air National Guard in 1997, toward that end. He served on the 108th Wing at Joint Base McGuire–Dix–Lakehurst, as a fire team member and leader with the security force squadron. In 1998, he wrote a letter to Home News Tribune, his local newspaper, expressing his skepticism towards America's soft stance against Saddam Hussein.

He was deployed to Saudi Arabia to support Operation Southern Watch in 1999, and to Kyrgyzstan to support Operation Enduring Freedom in 2003. Sicknick later criticized U.S. motivations for the War in Afghanistan and the government's strategy in the Iraq War. In 2003, he wrote again to Home News Tribune, noting a decline in morale among troops. He was honorably discharged in that same year as a staff sergeant.

Sicknick also worked as a school custodian in Cranbury, New Jersey. He later moved to Springfield, Virginia, and joined the United States Capitol Police in July 2008. One of his first assignments occurred during the first inauguration of Barack Obama. On December 31, 2013, he earned a Bachelor of Science in Criminal Justice degree from the University of Phoenix. Sicknick was an outspoken supporter of Donald Trump during the 2016 presidential election, but those who had met him "said his political views did not align neatly with one political party": he opposed Trump's impeachment, supported gun control, opposed animal cruelty and was concerned about the national debt. He was remembered by Caroline Behringer, a staffer for House Speaker Nancy Pelosi, for comforting her as she returned to work at the Capitol following Trump's 2016 victory.

Events of January 6
During the attack on the U.S. Capitol on January 6, 2021, Sicknick was on duty with the Capitol Police outside the Capitol's west side, on the front line facing protesters. At 2:23 p.m., rioters attempted to breach the police line formed by barricades of bicycle racks. Sicknick and some other officers there were pepper sprayed and became unable to perform their duties for about 20 minutes. Sicknick retreated, bent over, and used water to wash out his face. Within five minutes of the pepper spray attack, rioters breached the police line and seized control of the west side of the building.

There was no evidence that Sicknick had any injuries or an allergic reaction to the chemical spray, according to a statement by the medical examiner months later. Sicknick texted his brother on Wednesday night after the riot, reporting that he had been twice attacked with pepper spray and was in good shape. However, Sicknick later collapsed around 10 p.m. at the Capitol and was taken to a local hospital.

Death
After being in the hospital for almost a day, Brian Sicknick died around 9:30 p.m. on January 7, 2021. Earlier that day, he had two strokes. The strokes were due to a basilar artery blood clot, which caused damage to his brainstem and cerebellum. 

Sicknick's family had been informed that he was treated for a stroke caused by a blood clot, and had been surviving on a ventilator. Family members drove from New Jersey and had not yet arrived at the hospital when he died. The Sicknick family urged the public and press not to politicize his death.

On the night of his passing, the Capitol Police announced Sicknick's death in a press release stating that "Sicknick passed away due to injuries sustained while on-duty". Months later, the medical examiner reported that Sicknick had no injuries, and died of natural causes.

Medical examiner report
On April 19, 2021, the Office of the Chief Medical Examiner of the District of Columbia issued a press release about the death of Brian Sicknick. It said that the manner of death was natural and the cause of death was "acute brainstem and cerebellar infarcts due to acute basilar artery thrombosis" (two strokes at the base of the brain stem caused by an artery clot). The term "natural" was used to indicate a death caused by a disease alone; and if an injury contributed to the manner of death, it would not be considered natural. It took more than 100 days to release these results from the January autopsy. The full autopsy report was not released to the public. 

The chief medical examiner, Dr. Francisco J. Diaz, told The Washington Post that there was no evidence that Sicknick was injured or had an allergic reaction to chemical irritants. Due to privacy laws, he declined to say whether Sicknick had a preexisting medical condition. Diaz noted that Sicknick had engaged the rioters and said “all that transpired played a role in his condition.” 

According to CNN, some neurologists did not think that the strokes were natural. Stress and traumatic events can lead to a stroke. Based on media accounts, a forensic pathologist thought that Sicknick's manner of death could have been classified better as homicide, accident, or undetermined.

The Capitol Police said it accepted the medical examiner's findings "but this does not change the fact Officer Brian Sicknick died in the line of duty, courageously defending Congress and the Capitol."

Misinformation about cause of death
Accounts of Sicknick's death changed over time, amid an atmosphere of confusion. At first there were erroneous rumors and then there was incorrect information from the authorities and news media that lasted for months. 

As his condition deteriorated in the hospital on January 7, rumors had begun to circulate of an officer's death. In the afternoon, the U.S. Capitol Police (USCP) issued a statement rebutting such reports. Sicknick's family was told he was on a ventilator with a blood clot on his brain and his situation did not look good. He died later that night. 

Within hours of Sicknick's death, the Capitol Police released a statement late January 7 that Sicknick died "due to injuries sustained while on-duty" while "physically engaging with protesters" at the Capitol. On January 8, the United States Department of Justice published a statement by Acting Attorney General Jeffrey A. Rosen, which attributed Sicknick's death "to injuries he suffered defending the U.S. Capitol, against the violent mob who stormed it". Months later on April 19, the medical examiner reported that there was no evidence that Sicknick had any injuries.

Some initial media reports regarding Sicknick's cause of death were incorrect. On January 8, the Associated Press, The Wall Street Journal, and separate stories in The New York Times cited two anonymous law enforcement officials as saying that Sicknick was struck in the head by a fire extinguisher. Similar reports followed on January 9. Meanwhile, Sicknick's father said Sicknick was pepper-sprayed and hit in the head, reported Reuters on January 10.

On February 2, the U.S. House of Representatives made a reference to the New York Times article about Sicknick's death. In their memorandum for the second impeachment trial of Donald Trump was, "The insurrectionists killed a Capitol Police officer by striking him in the head with a fire extinguisher." On the same day, CNN reported that according to a law enforcement official, medical examiners had not found evidence of blunt force trauma on Sicknick's body. Investigators then thought the reports were false that Sicknick was injured by being struck with a fire extinguisher. On February 11, The New York Times reported that "police sources and investigators are at odds" over whether Sicknick had been hit with a fire extinguisher.

On February 2, it was reported that investigators were considering a chemical irritant as a possible cause of death. There were false implications by prosecutors that the chemical irritant was bear spray, until April 27 when they said it was pepper spray. On April 19, the medical examiner said that there was no evidence that Sicknick had an allergic reaction to a chemical spray.

In April and May 2021, Senator Ron Johnson (R-WI) sent letters to the acting U.S. Capitol Police chief requesting information on the handling of Sicknick's death. USCP General Counsel Thomas DiBiase replied that the department did not put out a release that Sicknick was assaulted with a fire extinguisher, and that DiBiase was unaware of any communication between the USCP and House Impeachment Managers about Sicknick's death.

Investigation and charges
In a January 7 press release, the U.S. Capitol Police (USCP) said that Sicknick's death would be investigated. The next day, the USCP opened a homicide investigation into Sicknick's death, joined by the D.C. Metropolitan Police Department and other federal agencies.

On February 2, CNN reported that investigators were having trouble finding evidence of homicide. One law enforcement official said that medical examiners found no evidence of any blunt force trauma. So investigators concluded that early reports of Sicknick being hit with a fire extinguisher were false. They considered the possibility that Sicknick became ill from a chemical irritant spray and were reviewing videos for evidence.

On March 14, Julian Khater and George Tanios were arrested by federal authorities and charged with crimes that included assault of Officer Sicknick with a chemical spray. There could not be a charge of homicide because the cause of death had not been determined. Autopsy results were still pending almost 10 weeks after Sicknick's death.

In an April 19 press release, the medical examiner's office said that Sicknick's death was by natural causes. The ruling made it difficult for prosecutors to pursue homicide charges. A week later, prosecutors said that the chemical sprayed on Sicknick was pepper spray.

On January 27, 2023, Julian Khater was sentenced to 6 years and 8 months in prison after pleading guilty to assaulting Capital Police Officers including Brian Sicknick with mace.

Memorials and funeral 

On January 8, 2021, House Speaker Nancy Pelosi ordered flags at the Capitol to be lowered to half-staff in honor of Sicknick. Vice President Mike Pence called Sicknick's family to offer his condolences, and a deputy press secretary for the Trump administration issued a written statement. The following weekend, Trump ordered flags to be flown at half-staff at all federal buildings, grounds, and vessels for three days. The governors of New Jersey and Virginia also ordered flags to be flown at half-staff in their respective states. On January 12, 2021, a memorial service was held in Sicknick's hometown of South River, New Jersey. His family, New Jersey Senator Bob Menendez, and local officials were in attendance. Menendez presented to Sicknick's family the flag that had flown over the Capitol in his honor. Sicknick's high school, East Brunswick Technical High School, announced plans to plant an oak tree on campus in his honor. The New Jersey Devils ice hockey team aired a video of New Jersey Governor Phil Murphy giving a brief eulogy for Sicknick, followed by a moment of silence.

On January 29, Pelosi and Senate Majority Leader Chuck Schumer announced that Sicknick would lie in honor at the Capitol rotunda. The arrival ceremony began on the evening of February 2, 2021, at the Capitol's east front, followed by a viewing period attended by President Joe Biden, who had taken office on January 20, and First Lady Jill Biden. Vice President Kamala Harris and Second Gentleman Doug Emhoff paid their respects on February 3, along with several legislators and police officers. Later that day, Sicknick's cremated remains, accompanied by a procession, departed the Capitol for Arlington National Cemetery, where burial took place. 

Members of Sicknick's family attended Super Bowl LV in February 2021 as honored guests of the National Football League, along with three officers of the Metropolitan Police Department.

On August 5, 2021, Brian Sicknick, along with Capitol Police officers Howard Liebengood and Billy Evans, and Metropolitan Police officer Jeffrey L. Smith, was posthumously honored in a signing ceremony for a bill to award Congressional Gold Medals to Capitol Police and other January 6 responders. His name is noted in the text of the bill, and Biden remarked on his death. At the December 2022 Congressional Gold Medal ceremony, Sicknick's family members refused to shake the hands of Mitch McConnell and Kevin McCarthy.

On January 6, 2023, for his role in defending the U.S. Capitol, Sicknick was posthumously awarded the Presidential Citizens Medal by President Joe Biden.

See also
 Jacob Chestnut and John Gibson, Capitol Police officers killed during the 1998 United States Capitol shooting

Notes

References

External links

Deaths by person in Washington, D.C.
Deaths related to the January 6 United States Capitol attack
Presidential Citizens Medal recipients

fr:Brian D. Sicknick